A chocolate truffle is a type of chocolate confectionery, traditionally made with a chocolate ganache centre coated in chocolate, cocoa powder, coconut, or chopped and toasted nuts (typically hazelnuts or almonds), usually in a spherical, conical, or curved shape.

Their name derives from their similar appearance to truffles, edible fungi of the genus Tuber.

Varieties

Major types of chocolate truffle include:

The Swiss truffle, made by combining melted chocolate into a boiling mixture of dairy cream and butter, which is poured into molds to set before sprinkling with cocoa powder. Like the French truffles, these have a very short shelf life and must be consumed within a few days of making.
The French truffle, made with fresh cream and chocolate, and then rolled in cocoa or nut powder.
The Spanish truffle, prepared with dark chocolate, condensed milk, rum (or any preferred liqueur), and chocolate sprinkles.
The typical European truffle, made with syrup and a base of cocoa powder, milk powder, fats, and other such ingredients to create an oil-in-water type of emulsion.
The American truffle, a half-oval-shaped, chocolate-coated truffle, a mixture of dark or milk chocolates with butterfat, and in some cases, hardened coconut oil. Joseph Schmidt, a San Francisco chocolatier, and founder of Joseph Schmidt Confections, is credited with its creation in the mid-1980s.

Other styles include:
The Belgian truffle or praline, made with dark or milk chocolate filled with ganache, buttercream, or nut pastes.
The Californian truffle, a larger, lumpier version of the French truffle, first made by Alice Medrich in 1973 after she tasted truffles in France. She sold these larger truffles in a charcuterie in the Gourmet Ghetto neighborhood of Berkeley; then, in 1977, she began selling them in her own store, Cocolat, which soon expanded into a chain. The American craze for truffles started with Medrich.

See also

 Bourbon ball
 Brigadeiro
 Chokladboll
 Rum ball

References

External links

Confectionery
Chocolate desserts